Edith Frances Mulhall Achilles (August 6, 1892 – March 1989), was an American psychologist who worked in school and clinical psychology. Over the course of her career, Achilles focused on the development of memory and recognition in children, and looked into test methods for measuring these skills.

Early life and education
Edith Frances Mulhall Achilles was born August 6, 1892, in Boston, Massachusetts. Little of Achilles' early life is known until she began her education at Barnard College at Columbia University. After earning her B.S. in 1914, Achilles received an A.M. and Ph.D. at Columbia University in 1915 and 1918, respectively.

In 1917, Edith married Paul Strong Achilles, a fellow student at Columbia University. Edith and Paul had one daughter.

Career 
After receiving her Ph.D. in 1918, Achilles began teaching at Columbia University and worked in the fields of school and clinical psychology. Once Paul earned his Ph.D. and began working in the field of psychology too, his work largely overshadowed Edith's. Edith worked for a number of years at Columbia University and the Psychological Corporation, which Paul directed from 1932 to 1946. Edith and Paul divorced in the 1930s, but Edith continued to work in the field of psychology. She consulted at Oxford University and was a trustee of her alma mater, Barnard College, for several years. Edith's work over the course of her career centered on how children develop memory and recognition, and what methods might be used as reliable tests of this development.

Works 
Edith published two notable papers during her career. The first, published in 1920, was entitled Experimental Studies in Recall and Recognition.

The second paper was published in 1935, in partnership with Clairette Papin Armstrong and M.J. Sacks. It was called A Report of the Special Committee on Immigration and Naturalization of the Chamber of Commerce of the State of New York Submitting a Study on Reactions of Puerto Rican Children in New York City to Psychological Tests.

See also 
 Developmental psychology
 Memory development
 School psychology
 Clinical psychology
 Psychological research and Psychological research methods

References 

1892 births
1989 deaths
Barnard College alumni
American women psychologists
Teachers College, Columbia University alumni
20th-century American women
People from Boston